Magan is a surname with Indian or Irish origins. The Irish surname originated in County Leitrim, Ireland.
Magan (मगन Hindi, मग्न Sanskrit) meaning sunk, or colloquially tipsy, is a surname common in the Hindi Belt.

Notable people with this name include
Given name
 Magan Singh Rajvi, Indian football (soccer) player

Middle name
 Hirsi Magan Isse (1935—2008), scholar and a leading figures of the Somali revolution
 Kaya Magan Cissé (c. 350), Soninke king of Wagadou

Surname
 Francis Magan, member of the Society of United Irishmen, barrister and informer
 George Magan, Baron Magan of Castletown (born 1945), Conservative member of the House of Lords in the UK
 George Magan (born 1895), Irish Gaelic footballer
 Manchán Magan, Irish writer, traveller and television maker
 Ruán Magan (born 1968), Irish director of documentaries and drama-documentaries
 Tony Magan (1911-1981), Irish republican and a chief of staff of the Irish Republican Army
 Juan Magán of DJs Magán & Rodríguez

References

Surnames of Irish origin